The Kamchatka brown bear  (Ursus arctos beringianus), also known as the Far Eastern brown bear, or in  , is a subspecies of brown bear.

Description

It is about the size of the Kodiak bear; however, the skull is broader than that of the Ussuri brown bear, and compared to that of the Kodiak bear, the breadth of the skull is much greater in proportion to its length, the anterior narial opening is much shorter, and the molars differ in relative size and form. Fur colour is predominantly dark brown with a violet tint. Light coloured individuals are rarely encountered.

Distribution 
It is native to the Anadyrsky District, the Kamchatka Peninsula, Karaginskiy Island, the Kuril Islands, the coastal strip west of the Sea of Okhotsk southward to the Stanovoy Range, and the Shantar Islands in the Far East. Outside the former Soviet Union, the subspecies occurs in Saint Lawrence Island in the Bering Sea. It is closely related to one clade of brown bears in Alaska and northwest North America, and is thought to be the ancestor of the Kodiak bear.

Behaviour and ecology

In the summer period they feed on blueberries, crowberries, humpback salmon, and steelhead. In autumn, they eat nuts from nut-pines and mountain ash, and fish. In times of famine they eat dead fish or marine mammals, berries, and graminoid vegetation.

Relationship with humans

Kamchatka brown bears are generally not dangerous to humans, and only 1% of encounters result in attack. The first Europeans who went to Kamchatka in the 19th century, although surprised by the number and size of bears there, observed that they were relatively harmless, compared to their Siberian counterparts. However, in July 2008, a platinum-mining compound in the Olyutorsky District of Kamchatka Krai was besieged by a group of 30 starving bears who killed two guards.

Trophy hunting
Kamchatka brown bears are among the most prized trophies for the Russian hunting industry. In 2005 the Kamchatka Department of Wildlife Management issued 500 hunting permits. Clients paid up to $10,000 to hunt bears. Thus, the economic impacts from recreational hunting of Kamchatka brown bears are significant. The recreational hunting of Kamchatka Brown Bears has led to endangerment of the species in Russia

References

External links

 Photos of the Kamchatka Brown Bear (Ursus arctos beringianus)  by Klaus Nigge

Eurasian brown bears
Carnivorans of Asia
Endemic fauna of Russia
Fauna of Siberia
Mammals of Russia
Endemic fauna of Kamchatka
Kuril Islands
Mammals described in 1851